is an FM radio station in Aichi Prefecture, Japan. The station is an affiliate of Japan FM Network (JFN).

FM Aichi's main studios are located in Tsurumai in Naka-ku, Nagoya.

See also
 List of radio stations in Japan

External links
  

Radio stations in Japan
Companies based in Nagoya
Mass media in Nagoya